Dimitrios Baltas (born 13 May 1958) is a Greek sports shooter. He competed in three events at the 1992 Summer Olympics.

References

1958 births
Living people
Greek male sport shooters
Olympic shooters of Greece
Shooters at the 1992 Summer Olympics
Sportspeople from Athens
20th-century Greek people